= Tenba =

Town of ancient Bithynia

Coordinates: 41°07′54″N 30°01′12″E

Tenba was a town of ancient Bithynia near the coast of the Pontus Euxinus inhabited during Roman times. Its name does not occur in ancient authors, but is inferred from epigraphic and other evidence.

Its site is located near Bağırganlı (formerly, Bazirgan) in Asiatic Turkey.
